The 2006 ACC Trophy was a cricket tournament in Kuala Lumpur, Malaysia, taking place between 14 August and 26 August 2006. It gave associate and affiliate members of the Asian Cricket Council experience in international one-day cricket.

This was the last tournament in which all teams played in the same tournament. After this tournament, the Asian Cricket Council decided to split the tournament into two divisions. The top ten teams would be promoted to the 2008 ACC Trophy Elite and the rest of the teams would be relegated to the 2009 ACC Trophy Challenge.

Teams
There were 17 teams that played in the tournament. These teams were non-test member nations of the Asian Cricket Council. The teams that played were:

Squads

Group stage
Top two from each group qualifies for the quarterfinals.

Group A

Points table

Fixtures

Group B

Points table

Fixtures

Group C

Points table

Fixtures

Group D

Points table

Fixtures

Quarterfinals
The teams that win their matches qualify for the semifinals. The losing teams compete for 5th place in the plate semifinals.

Semifinals
The teams that win their matches qualify for the final. The losing teams compete in the third place playoff.

3rd Place Playoff

Final

Plate

Final Placings
The top eight were ranked on their performance in the quarterfinals and playoffs. The rest were ranked based on the points and net run rate attained during the group stage.

Statistics

External links
ACC Trophy 2006 - Official Site

International cricket competitions in 2006
ACC Trophy
Acc Trophy, 2006
International cricket competitions in Malaysia